Innanje railway station is a halt station on Konkan Railway. The preceding station (on the way to Mangalore junction) on the line is Udupi railway station and the next station is Padubidri railway station.

References 

Railway stations along Konkan Railway line
Railway stations in Udupi district
Karwar railway division